Montserrat Pujol Clusella (born 27 April 1961 in Sabadell) is a retired Spanish hurdler and middle-distance runner. She represented her country at the 1988 Summer Olympics as well as one outdoor and one indoor World Championships.

International competitions

Personal bests
Outdoor
400 metres – 53.59 (Sittard 1978)
800 metres – 2:00.56 (Seville 1989)
1000 metres – 2:34.96 (Jerez 1989)
1500 metres – 4:07.7 (Oslo 1990)
One mile – 4:25.17 (Zürich 1989)
400 metres hurdles – 57.29 (Barcelona 1982)
Indoor
800 metres – 2:02.31 (Liévin 1987)
1000 metres – 2:44.61 (Madrid 1990)
1500 metres – 4:09.48 (San Sebastián 1990)

References

RFEA profile

1961 births
Living people
Spanish female middle-distance runners
Spanish female hurdlers
Olympic athletes of Spain
Athletes (track and field) at the 1988 Summer Olympics
Sportspeople from Sabadell
Athletes (track and field) at the 1987 Mediterranean Games
Mediterranean Games competitors for Spain